The JVC GZ-MG555 camcorder (in North America), also known as the JVC GZ-MG575 (in Asia and Europe), was produced by JVC in 2007. It records standard definition MPEG-2 video onto either a built-in hard disk drive or on a secure digital memory card in MOD format.

Video can be recorded in four quality settings: Ultra Fine (720 x 480, 8.5Mbit/s), Fine (720 x 480, 5.5Mbit/s), Normal (720 x 480, 4.2Mbit/s), and Economy (352 x 240, 1.5Mbit/s). The built-in hard drive has a capacity of 30GB (40GB for GZ-MG575) and can hold up to 7 hours of video when recorded at the highest quality setting. 

When recording to a memory card, the recording time depends only on the capacity of the card. The GZ-MG555 uses full-size SDHC memory cards. One 4GB card can fit roughly 1 hour of video at the highest quality setting. There are no limitations for using any of the recording formats when recording to a memory card.

In 2007 this camcorder had the largest imaging sensor for a consumer camcorder, 1/2.5". Other distinguishing features of this camcorder include:

 External microphone jack
 Accessory shoe
 Built-in neutral-density filter
 FireWire port
 Threaded lens barrel for attachments
 Black body color

Lacking from the camcorder is an optical viewfinder, headphone output, focus ring, and full manual mode.

Specification 
 Sensor: 1/2.5-inch 5.37 Megapixel CCD
 Lens speed: f/3.5
 Filter Diameter: 46 mm
 Optical Zoom: 10x
 Image Stabiliser: digital
 Viewfinder: No
 LCD Screen: 2.8"
 Headphone Out: No
 Microphone In: Yes
 Recording media: built-in 30GB (GZ-MG555) or 40GB (GZ-MG575) HDD, SDHC memory card (card is not included)
 Weight: 750 g

References

External links

Product Information and Reviews 
 First impressions by CamcorderInfo
 Full review by CamcorderInfo
 Review by CNet
 Hands-on review by AVCHDUser
 Review by PCWorld
 Review by Videomaker

Practical Solutions 
 Working with JVC Everio MOD files
 JVC tapeless workflow

Sample videos 
 Outdoors, daytime, handheld

GZ-MG555